Edward Annis may refer to:
 Teddy Hart (Edward Ellsworth Annis, born 1980), Canadian professional wrestler
 Edward R. Annis (1913–2009), Florida surgeon